This article is a list of seasons completed by the San Francisco 49ers, an American football franchise representing the San Francisco Bay Area. The 49ers are members of the West division in the National Football Conference (NFC) of the National Football League (NFL). The San Francisco 49ers began play in 1946 as charter members of the All-America Football Conference. When the 49ers joined the NFL after the AAFC-NFL merger in 1950, they never won a division or conference title, and only finished as high as second once from 1950 to 1969. After winning three consecutive division titles from 1970 to 1972, they would return to losing in 1973 and achieved only one winning season for the rest of the decade. From 1981 to 1998, the 49ers had one of the most successful stretches of dominance in NFL history. Armed with Bill Walsh's innovative West Coast offense, Hall of Fame level quarterback play in Joe Montana and later Steve Young, and a dominant defense, the 49ers would win 5 Super Bowls in 1981, 1984, 1988, 1989, and 1994, and made the playoffs every year but  and  during their run of dominance.  

Another playoff drought lasted from –, a stretch of eight non-winning seasons. From 2011 to 2013, they earned three straight berths in the NFC Championship Game, which included a loss to the Baltimore Ravens in Super Bowl XLVII. They would have another stretch of non-winning seasons from – before a 13–3 turnaround season in 2019 saw them win the NFC, but lose to the Chiefs in Super Bowl LIV.

Seasons

Statistics above are current as of January 29, 2023.

All-time records

1 Due to a strike-shortened season in 1982, all teams were ranked by conference instead of division.

References

 
 
 
 

 
San Francisco 49ers
Seasons